Maria Marlene Mungunda (born 11 September 1954 in Mariental, Hardap Region) is a Namibian politician who served in several portfolios as minister. She is a teacher by profession and worked as teacher from 1975 to 1996.

Career 
A member of the SWAPO, Mungunda worked in the lower party structures for her home town Mariental and for the Southern region. In 1996 she entered parliament. She was appointed deputy minister of Minister of Gender Equality and Child Welfare in 2000. In 2004 she was promoted to Minister of Labour and Social Welfare, and in 2005 she returned to the gender equality ministry, this time as minister.

References 

Living people
1954 births
People from Hardap Region
SWAPO politicians
Gender equality and social welfare ministers of Namibia
Labour ministers of Namibia
21st-century Namibian women politicians
21st-century Namibian politicians
Women government ministers of Namibia
Women members of the National Assembly (Namibia)
Members of the National Assembly (Namibia)
20th-century women educators
20th-century Namibian politicians
20th-century Namibian women politicians